Ibrahima Tallé (born 31 March 1968) is a Burkinabé footballer. He played in 13 matches for the Burkina Faso national football team from 1998 to 2000. He was also named in Burkina Faso's squad for the 1998 African Cup of Nations tournament.

References

External links
 

1968 births
Living people
Burkinabé footballers
Burkina Faso international footballers
1998 African Cup of Nations players
Place of birth missing (living people)
Association footballers not categorized by position
21st-century Burkinabé people